Nephilim Grove is the eleventh studio album by American extreme metal band Novembers Doom. The album was released on November 1, 2019 via Prophecy Productions.

Track listing

Personnel 
Novembers Doom
 Paul Kuhr – vocals
 Lawrence Roberts – guitars
 Vito Marchese – guitars
 Mike Feldman – bass guitar
 Garry Naples – drums

Additional personnel
 Dan Swanö – mastering, mixing
 Pig Hands – cover art

References

2019 albums
Novembers Doom albums